New Bullards Bar Reservoir is a large reservoir in northeastern Yuba County, California, United States, at an elevation of  in the Tahoe National Forest and about 30 miles (50 km) northeast of Yuba City. The  reservoir is formed by New Bullards Bar Dam on the North Yuba River, a tributary of the Yuba River. It also receives a portion of the Middle Fork's flow that is diverted to the reservoir via tunnels.

The dam is a 635-foot (194 m) high concrete variable radius arch dam. It was finished in 1970 and is owned by the Yuba Water Agency (Yuba County Water Agency, formally), which is a special district government agency based in Marysville, Ca. While this is only 17.5% of the reservoir's total capacity, it is enough to create a medium-sized reservoir by itself. The dam also provides water for irrigation, hydroelectricity production and recreation, including boating, water skiing, fishing, mountain biking and camping.

The California Office of Environmental Health Hazard Assessment (OEHHA) has developed a safe eating advisory for fish caught in New Bullards Bar Reservoir based on their levels of mercury or PCBs.

The reservoir provides water to power two hydroelectric plants, New Colgate Powerhouse and Fish Release Powerhouse. New Colgate Powerhouse is not located at the base of the dam, like most hydroelectric plants. Instead, the  diameter New Colgate Tunnel carries the water about 5 miles (8 km) southwest of the dam to the powerhouse. This increases the head, which allows the plant to produce more electricity. The dam's Pelton wheels are the largest ever built and have a combined capacity of 315 MW. Some water is released at the base of the dam so that the streambed is not completely dewatered upstream of the New Colgate Powerhouse tailrace. This water powers the 150 kW Fish Release Powerhouse. In the event of a power outage, this plant can operate the dam's massive spillway gates.

Bullards Bar Reservoir is also used for outdoor recreation. Water Ski Magazine rates Bullards Bar Reservoir as one of the best recreational lakes in the United States. Bullards Bar is a mountain biking destination, with about 19 miles of hiking and biking trails, primarily on the east side of the lake. The trails are maintained by the USFS Yuba Ranger District and volunteers from Bicyclists of Nevada County or. Bullards Bar offers two boat launching facilities with one launch ramp adjacent to Emerald Cove Marina. Emerald Cove Marina offers a variety of services, such as a general store, gasoline, boat moorage, and camping as well as houseboat, ski, patio, and fishing boat rentals.

There are two boat ramps, Cottage Creek (usable until the reservoir falls below 1,822 feet) and Dark Day (usable until the reservoir falls below 1798 feet).  Both ramps are free.

See also
List of dams and reservoirs in California
List of lakes in California
List of largest reservoirs of California

References

Emerald Cove Marina at Bullards Bar Reservoir
University of California Davis
Yuba Water Agency website

Reservoirs in Yuba County, California
Yuba River
Lakes of the Sierra Nevada (United States)
Tahoe National Forest
Tourist attractions in Yuba County, California
Reservoirs in Northern California